St James Parish, Cumberland is one of the 57 parishes of Cumberland County, New South Wales, a cadastral unit for use on land titles. It is one of the four small parishes in the Sydney city area, which is named after the Anglican church of St James, which was consecrated in 1824. The name St James is also used today for the railway station in the same area.

A record for a marriage, funeral or baptism ceremony held in the 'Parish of St James' refers to this civil parish, not necessarily meaning the Anglican church of St James, and the church notes that this has been the case of some confusion. A marriage held at the catholic St Mary's Cathedral in the 19th century would be recorded as being in the Parish of St James.

Locations 

The parish includes a large number of tourist attractions and important buildings in Sydney, including the Sydney Opera House, Sydney Tower, NSW parliament house, Royal Botanic Gardens The Domain, the part of Hyde Park north of Park street, Circular Quay, and Martin Place. The parish is bounded by the area which was originally the Tank Stream (now Pitt Street near Circular Quay), and George Street in the west. It is bounded by Park Street and part of William Street in the south, and Young Crescent and Woolloomooloo Bay in the east.

Images 

Images of locations in the Parish of St James:

References

 

Parishes of Cumberland County